Family Portrait is the debut studio album by British electronic musician Ross from Friends. It was released on Brainfeeder on 27 July 2018.

Critical reception

At Metacritic, which assigns a weighted average score out of 100 to reviews from mainstream critics, the album received an average score of 77, based on 14 reviews, indicating "generally favorable reviews".

Paul Simpson of AllMusic gave the album 4 out of 5 stars, writing, "Like his older releases, this one favors grainy textures and sentimental vocal samples, but the beats are more broken this time out, drawing from electro and new wave rather than just the evenly paced pulse of house." He described it as "an uncommonly original album, keeping listeners guessing while making a significant, sometimes unexpected emotional impact."

Accolades

Track listing

Personnel
Credits adapted from liner notes.

 Ross from Friends – production
 John Dunk – saxophone (2, 11)
 Lee Marshall – artwork

Charts

References

External links
 

2018 debut albums
Brainfeeder albums